A number of video games have been made of Le Mans 24 Hours. The race, the Circuit de la Sarthe, and competing cars have been featured in racing games such as the Gran Turismo series.

History

The first Le Mans video game was in 1976 by Atari, an upright standing arcade game with a steering wheel and white raster graphics on a black background.

In 1982, Commodore released a LeMans game for the Commodore 64, which was actually a clone of a 1979 Sega game, Monaco GP.

Next came the arcade game WEC Le Mans, developed by Konami and released in 1986. For the following year, this arcade game was subsequently ported to the Amstrad CPC, Commodore 64, MSX, and ZX Spectrum by Ocean Software. The game broke down the race in four laps (two on daytime and two after sunset), divided as well into three checkpoints. Due to the limitations of the hardware, all cars have the same design and do not correspond to actual models. The advertising in both sides of the road is also limited to the name of the game and its creators.

Over ten years later, in 1997, Sega released the arcade exclusive Le Mans 24. As a Japanese publisher, the game marked a debut for the 1991 winner, the Mazda 787B, before appearing in subsequent driving games including the later Gran Turismo series, the 1971 JWA Gulf Porsche 917K appears as a bonus car.

Two years later, the French video game publisher Infogrames, who incidentally absorbed Ocean, released Le Mans 24 Hours for PlayStation and PC. The game was developed by UK company Eutechnyx. In the US the game was released under the name Test Drive: Le Mans.

In the following year the same software house released Le Mans 24 Hours on the Dreamcast. This version of the game was originally planned to be a port from the PlayStation, but was eventually developed from scratch by Australian company Melbourne House which had recently been purchased by Infogrames. As with the previous PlayStation version, the Dreamcast game was released in the US under their Test Drive brand as Test Drive: Le Mans. This was one of the most critically acclaimed racing games on the Dreamcast, often hailed as the single best driving game available for the Dreamcast system. Following the release of the Dreamcast version of Le Mans 24 Hours, Infogrames and Melbourne House developed and released a port of the Dreamcast game on the PlayStation 2 in 2001.

In 2002, a PC port of the Le Mans 24 Hours game was created by another Australian video game developer, Torus.

The circuit appears in Gran Turismo 4, released in 2004. The game uses the then-current layout and can be run with or without the two chicanes. The player can race against 5 other AI cars in a full-24 Hour long race on both the Circuit de la Sarthe with the chicanes on the Mulsanne Straight or without them. The opponent vehicles range from Le Mans Prototype cars, such as the BMW V12 LMR and the Audi R8, to Group C-spec sports prototypes, such as the Sauber C9 and the Mazda 787B.

Several versions of the Circuit in its past and present layouts have been made by the user community for the 2005 rFactor and 2006 GTR 2 driving simulation and the rFactor WEC mod version of Fancy Nancy Le Mans Racing Legends.

In Race Driver Grid, released in 2008, the player is able to race at Le Mans, in a condensed 12-minute race, 24-minute race, one hour race, and so forth to full 24-hours race. According to the time scale chosen, day and night occur at different times. Cars & drivers from the 2006 Race are featured. The Circuit de la Sarthe depicted in the game is much wider, with corners such as Dunlop and Arnage having a much shorter run in, and with significant elevation changes on the track (such as the Hunaudières curve) almost imperceptible.

The entire circuit is available for racing in Forza Motorsport 3 and again in 2011 in Forza Motorsport 4, in 2013 in Forza Motorsport 5, in 2015 in Forza Motorsport 6, and in 2017 in Forza Motorsport 7.

Gran Turismo 5, released in November 2010, also includes the Le Mans circuit, along with two 24 hour races. Variations include the 2005 version and 2009 version, which has the redeveloped area around the Dunlop Curve with more run-off area, and the extended pit lane exit. There is also the option of changeable time of day, and variable weather. The successor of GT5, Gran Turismo 6, released in December 2013, includes not only the 2005 and 2009 version, but also the 2013 version.

iRacing, released in 2008, has the addition of the Le Mans circuit in 2016, featuring the track as it was configured for the 2015 event. It is also possible to use the 2015 layout with the Mulsanne chicanes removed.

Project CARS and  Project CARS 2 of Slightly Mad Studios included Circuit de la Sarthe under the project name Loire.

References

External links
WEC Le Mans 24 at Arcade-History.com
A Time Attack Challenge board dedicated to Dreamcast Test Drive Le Mans
Top Dreamcast Racing Games

24 Hours of Le Mans
Racing video games
Video games developed in Australia
Video games developed in Canada
Video games developed in the United Kingdom